Stockland Wetherill Park (known as “Stockies” to locals) is a shopping mall in Wetherill Park, Sydney, Australia. Being an indoor and outdoor shopping centre, it is 47th-largest by area in the country.

Features
The shopping centre features Coles, Woolworths, Big W, Kmart, JB Hi-Fi, Angus & Coote and 200 specialty stores, including over 20 fashion stores. It also features a refurbished, twelve-screen Hoyts cinema with leather seating and recliners, a 24-hour gym and alfresco dining with floor-to-ceiling windows. The center features "The Grove", which contains an 800-seat indoor-outdoor food terrace with 14 restaurants, cafes and food operators, with those outside being in a lane-way setting. Cuisines in the eateries include Thai, Mexican, Vietnamese and Italian, among others.

The center has also opened an extra 910 car parking spaces in 2016, bringing the total to close to 2700 spaces, which is a 30% increase on the number of spaces available before the redevelopment. The mall's height is roughly around 15 metres. Furthermore, the shopping centre also includes a children's playground, which is on the outdoor section of the mall.

Reception

Stockland Group Executive and CEO of Commercial Property, John Schroder, stated: “There is no other mall quite like Stockland Wetherill Park anywhere in Australia. It delivers an unparalleled retail experience, anchored by fresh food and fast casual dining with a modern twist on laneway-style street food vendors and entertainment.”

On the reopening Chris Bowen MP, Member for McMahon, Shadow Treasurer, Dr Hugh McDermott MP, Member for Prospect and Mayor of Fairfield City Council, Frank Carbone attended the official opening and toured the centre.

Since opening stage 1 in 2015, Stockland Wetherill Park has received more than 5 million people through the new subdivisions of the mall. Furthermore, Stockland attained a 5 Star Green Star Retail ‘Design’ rating through the Green Building Council of Australia earlier that year.

Access
The Liverpool-Parramatta Rapid Bus Transitway has a station at the complex, and there are a number of bus stops belonging to Transit Systems Sydney that operate nearby. A taxi zone is located on Polding Street which are both within the realm of the shopping mall.

See also
Fairfield Showground, nearby marketplace

References

Shopping centres in New South Wales
Shopping centres in Sydney
Shopping malls established in 1983
1983 establishments in Australia
City of Fairfield